Abd al-Rahim ibn Ja'far ibn Sulayman al-Hashimi (died ca. 844) was a ninth century Abbasid personage and governor of the Yemen.

Career 
The son of Ja'far ibn Sulayman ibn Ali al-Hashimi, Abd al-Rahim was a minor member of the Abbasid dynasty, being a second nephew of the caliphs al-Saffah (r. 750–754) and al-Mansur (r. 754–775). He was appointed governor of the Yemen by the caliph al-Mu'tasim (r. 833–842), and he arrived in Sana'a near the beginning of 836. During his governorship he was forced to deal with the Yu'firid rebel Yu'fir ibn Abd al-Rahman al-Hiwali, who imprisoned the previous governor Abbad ibn al-Ghamr al-Shihabi and his son and defeated an expedition sent against him. Abd al-Rahim remained governor until 839, when he was dismissed in favor of Ja'far ibn Dinar al-Khayyat.

Abd al-Rahim was later arrested during the caliphate of al-Wathiq (r. 842–847) and forced to surrender his wealth. He died in prison in ca. 844.

Notes

References 
 
 
 
 
 
 

844 deaths
9th-century people from the Abbasid Caliphate
9th-century Arabs
Abbasid governors of Yemen
Abbasids
Prisoners and detainees of the Abbasid Caliphate
9th century in Yemen